Bryan See Tian Keat (born 22 June 1993) is a Malaysian footballer who plays as a goalkeeper for Malaysia Super League club Perak.

Early life 
See was born in Subang Jaya, Selangor, to Eau Teong See and Pih Ngit Ding. He began his youth career with the Subang Jaya Community Sports Club (SJCSC) before moving on to the Arsenal Soccer School and Brazilian Football Club.

Career

Youth career
See played for PKNS U21 for two seasons, before playing for Perak FA for two years, leading the team to the Sultan Gold Cup championship and a runner-up finish in the Malaysia U21 league. He then furthered his studies in the United States, playing for the collegiate teams of University of California, Irvine and Johns Hopkins University. He graduated with a degree in civil engineering from the latter in 2017.

PKNP
See then returned to Malaysia and signed with PKNP, whose head coach, Abu Bakar Fadzim, were his former youth coach at Perak. He made his professional debut for PKNP in a Super League match against Kedah on 11 February 2018.

Bangkok
On 28 December, See confirmed he was moving to Thailand's Thai League 3 to join Bangkok FC.

Career statistics

Club

References

External links 
 
 Interview in SemuanyaBola.com (in Malay)

Living people
1993 births
Malaysian people of Chinese descent
Malaysian footballers
Association football goalkeepers
Bryan See Tian Keat
PKNP FC players
PDRM FA players
Penang F.C. players
Melaka United F.C. players
Perak F.C. players
Malaysia Super League players
Malaysian expatriate footballers
UC Irvine Anteaters men's soccer players
Johns Hopkins Blue Jays athletes
People from Petaling District